Mōlehu Point is a headland on the south-east coast of the island of Kauai in the Hawaiian Islands.

References

External links 
 

Headlands of Kauai